Guse is a surname. Notable people with the surname include:

Bernd Guse (born 1941), West German sprint canoer
Bruno Guse (born 1939), German boxer
Kerry-Anne Guse (born 1972), Australian tennis player
Udo Guse (born 1967), German weightlifter

See also
Gose (surname)